Sam Gowland (born 2 August 1995) is an English television personality and social media celebrity. He rose to fame when he participated in the third series of the ITV2 dating reality competition Love Island in 2017. After his stint on the programme, he began appearing in the MTV reality show Geordie Shore, debuting in the sixteenth series in 2018.

Early life
Gowland was born on 2 August 1995 in Middlesbrough, England and was raised in Thornaby-on-Tees. After leaving school, he became an oil rig worker.

Gowland is the cousin of footballer Jonathan Grounds, who currently plays for Championship club Birmingham City.

Career
On 29 May 2017, Gowland was unveiled as one of the eleven original contestants for the third series of the ITV2 dating reality competition Love Island. During his first stint on the series, he was "coupled up" with four different women, originally with Camilla Thurlow. On Day 23, he was "dumped" from the programme, alongside Chloë Crowhurst; Gowland had been coupled up with her and Crowhurst had also been an original contestant. However, Gowland and fellow "dumpee" Mike Thalassitis returned to the programme on Day 39, in which they became the first Islanders to return to the villa having been dumped from the island, after being voted back in a recent public vote. Gowland then coupled up with Georgia Harrison, before they were dumped together on Day 46, just a week after his return and days prior to the live final.

Five months after Love Island concluded, in December 2017, it was confirmed that Gowland would join the cast of the sixteenth series of MTV reality show Geordie Shore, which commenced on 9 January 2018. Gowland was notable for his row with fellow cast member Alex MacPherson in the seventeenth series after the latter made unintentional sexual advances towards Gowland's girlfriend Chloe Ferry and voluntarily leaving the house in the tenth episode after sustaining a minor injury before returning in the following episode. In October 2019, it was confirmed that Gowland, as well as his co-star Tahlia Chung, would not be returning for the twenty-first series, ending long-running speculation over his future as a result of the breakdown of his and Ferry's relationship.

Filmography

List of MMA fights 
1 winner – 0 losses – 0 draws

See also
 List of Love Island contestants

References

1995 births
Living people
People from Middlesbrough
English television personalities
Love Island (2015 TV series) contestants